Leontius I of Jerusalem, also Leo, was Patriarch of Jerusalem of the Church of Jerusalem from 911 to 928. Little is known about his activities while he was patriarch.

Career 
Leontius was elected to the patriarchal see in 911 after Patr. Sergius II of Jerusalem reposed. In 923, the patriarchate was plagued by Muslim riots when they were angered by several victories by the Byzantine armies in the Arab–Byzantine wars. The rioters took special revenge on the Christians in Ashkelon and Caesarea where all the churches were destroyed. The Church eventually received permission from Caliph al-Muqtadir to rebuild the churches.

Patr. Leontius I was succeeded as patriarch by Anastasius (or Athanasius) in 929.

References 

10th-century patriarchs of Jerusalem
Christianity in the Abbasid Caliphate
Palestine under the Abbasid Caliphate
928 deaths
Year of birth unknown